The men's 70 kilograms event at the 2006 Asian Games was held on December 8, 2006 at the Al-Dana Banquet Hall in Doha, Qatar.

Schedule
All times are Arabia Standard Time (UTC+03:00)

Results

Prejudging round

Final round 

 Sayed Faisal Husain of Bahrain originally won the silver medal, but was disqualified after he failed the drug test.

References

Results – Prejudging Round
Results – Final Round

Bodybuilding at the 2006 Asian Games